The Susitna Hydroelectric Project (commonly called the Susitna Dam or the Susitna-Watana Dam) was a proposed hydroelectric power project along the Susitna River in southern Alaska. The project, which originally consisted of two dams along the river, was proposed as early as the 1960s by the U.S. Bureau of Reclamation to supply electricity to the railbelt region of Alaska (areas served by the Alaska Railroad), including the cities of Anchorage and Fairbanks. At the time, it was known as the Devil's Canyon Dam, for its location just upstream of Devils Canyon, a -deep gorge and whitewater rapids formed by the Susitna River. When oil prices and state revenue (based on taxes levied on oil extraction) declined, the plan was put on hold. When oil prices rose to then-record highs in 2008, the rising price of electricity in Alaska caused a revival of interest in the proposal.

The Susitna Hydroelectric project, to be built by the Alaska Energy Authority, was projected to cost $5.2 billion. The dam would consistently produce between 280 and 300 megawatts of power, or about 2,800 GWh per year. Electricity from the dam would supply about two-thirds of Alaska's population. The alternative is use of natural gas as fuel for generators. Whether to build a natural gas pipeline is also at issue.

The Susitna river, which drains into the Cook Inlet, is a major salmon spawning ground. The site of the proposed dam is upstream of the breeding grounds of salmon, but if the dam is constructed the pattern of flow in the river will change due to operation of the dam.

On June 29, 2016, Alaska's governor Bill Walker vetoed the construction of the dam. The reasons were both environmental and economic.

Notes

External links 

 Alaska Energy Authority reports on Susitna
 Coalition for Susitna Dam Alternatives
 Fairbanks Utilities cost more than double the national average
 Fairbanks winter air quality fails to meet EPA standards
 Ground Truth Trekking technical information on the dam plus Ground Truth journey

Hydroelectric power plants in Alaska
Buildings and structures in Matanuska-Susitna Borough, Alaska

Proposed hydroelectric power stations
Proposed renewable energy power stations in the United States